Belize is a small Central American nation, located at 17°15' north of the equator and 88°45' west of the Prime Meridian on the Yucatán Peninsula. It borders the Caribbean Sea to the east, with 386 km of coastline. It has a total of 542 km of land borders—Mexico to the north-northwest (272 km) and Guatemala to the south-southwest (266 km).

Belize is the only country in Central America without a Pacific coastline. Belize's largest river is the eponymous Belize River. Belize's lowest elevation is at sea level.

The climate in Belize is tropical, with a rainy season from June to November and a dry season from January to May. Natural hazards include hurricanes (mostly in the late Atlantic hurricane season, September to December) and coastal flooding, especially in the south. There's also barely any permanent water.

Physical features
Topographical feature divide the Belizean landscape into two main physiographic regions. The most visually striking of these regions is distinguished by the Maya Mountains and the associated basins and plateaus that dominate all but the narrow coastal plain in the southern half of the country. The mountains rise to heights of about 1,100 metres, with the highest point being Doyle's Delight (1,124 m) in the Cockscomb Range, a spur of the Maya Mountains in Western Belize. Covered with shallow, highly erodible soils of low fertility, these heavily forested highlands are very sparsely inhabited.

The second region comprises the northern lowlands, along with the southern coastal plain. Eighteen major rivers and many perennial streams drain these low-lying areas. The coastline is flat and swampy, with many lagoons, especially in the northern and central parts of the country. Westward from the northern coastal areas, the terrain changes from mangrove swamp to tropical pine savanna and hardwood forest.

Belize is the only country in Central America without a coastline on the North Pacific Ocean.

Rivers

The interlocking networks of rivers, creeks, and lagoons have played a key role in the historical geography of Belize. The largest and most historically important river is the Belize River, which drains more than one-quarter of the country as it winds along the northern edge of the Maya Mountains across the center of the country to the sea near Belize City. Also known as the Old River, the Belize River is navigable up to the Guatemalan border and served as the main artery of commerce and communication between the interior and the coast until well into the twentieth century.

Other historically important rivers include the Sibun River, which drains the northeastern edge of the Maya Mountains, and the New River, which flows through the northern sugar-growing areas before emptying into Chetumal Bay. Both of these river valleys possess fertile alluvial soils and have supported considerable cultivation and human settlement.

Islands

Climate

Belize has a tropical climate with pronounced wet and dry seasons, although there are significant variations in weather patterns by region. Temperatures vary according to elevation, proximity to the coast, and the moderating effects of the northeast trade winds off the Caribbean. Temperatures are slightly higher inland, except for the southern highland plateaus, such as the Mountain Pine Ridge, where it is noticeably cooler year round. Overall, the seasons are marked more by differences in humidity and rainfall than in temperature.

The dry season is shorter in the south, normally only lasting from February to April. A shorter, less rainy period, known locally as the "little dry," usually occurs in late July or August, after the initial onset of the rainy season.

Hurricanes 
Hurricanes have played a devastating role in Belizean history. In 1931 an unnamed hurricane destroyed over two-thirds of the buildings in Belize City and killed more than 1,000 people. In 1955 Hurricane Janet leveled the northern town of Corozal. A hurricane that devastated Belize was Hurricane Greta, which caused more than US$25 million in damages along the southern coast in 1978.

There was a period of 20 years that Belize was considered as a hurricane-free zone by many until Hurricane Mitch (October 1998) caused quite a stir and gave rise to hurricane awareness and the National Emergency Management Organization (NEMO).  Two years later Tropical Storm Chantal and Hurricane Keith did much to put the country on the hurricane map.

In 2001, Hurricane Iris swept through the southern part of Belize causing damage that ranged in the hundreds of millions due largely to wiping away the banana industry, crippling the citrus and tourism in the area. Six years later, the fury of Category Five Dean landed on the Yucatán coast at Mahahual and Corozal in northern Belize, was not spared the brunt of reportedly Category 3 to 4 winds. Hurricane Dean did tens of millions in damages, especially to the infantile papaya industry and to a lesser extent to the endemic sugar cane industry.

Geology
Belizean geology consists largely of varieties of limestone, with the notable exception of the Maya Mountains, a large uplifted block of intrusive Paleozoic granite and sediments running northeast to southwest across the south-central part of the country. Several major faults rive these highlands, but much of Belize lies outside the tectonically active zone that underlies most of Central America. During the Cretaceous Period, what is now the western part of the Maya Mountains stood above sea level, creating the oldest land surface in Central America, the Mountain Pine Ridge plateau.

The hilly regions surrounding the Maya Mountains are formed from Cretaceous limestone. These areas are characterized by a karst topography that is typified by numerous sinkholes, caverns, and underground streams. In contrast to the Mountain Pine Ridge, some of the soils in these regions are quite fertile and have been cultivated during at least the past 4,000 years.

Much of the northern half of Belize lies on the Yucatán Platform, a tectonically stable region. Although mostly level, this part of the country also has occasional areas of hilly, karst terrain, such as the Yalbac Hills along the western border with Guatemala and the Manatee Hills between Belize City and Dangriga. Alluvial deposits of varying fertility cover the relatively flat landscapes of the coastal plains.

Environmental issues 
Environmental degradation issues in Belize include deforestation, water pollution from sewage, industrial effluents, agricultural runoff, and solid waste disposal.

Belize is party to the Basel Convention, Convention on Biological Diversity, Ramsar Convention, CITES, Convention on the Prevention of Marine Pollution by Dumping of Wastes and Other Matter, International Convention for the Regulation of Whaling, Montreal Protocol, MARPOL 73/78, United Nations Convention on the Law of the Sea, United Nations Convention to Combat Desertification, and United Nations Framework Convention on Climate Change.

Natural resources
Although a number of economically important minerals exist in Belize, none has been found in quantities large enough to warrant their mining. Those minerals include dolomite, barite (source of barium), bauxite (source of aluminum), cassiterite (source of tin), and gold. In 1990 limestone, used in road building, was the only mineral resource being exploited for either domestic or export use.

The similarity of Belizean geology to that of oil-producing areas of Mexico and Guatemala prompted oil companies, principally from the United States, to explore for petroleum at both offshore and on-land sites in the early 1980s. Initial results were promising, but the pace of exploration slowed later in the decade, and production operations never commenced. As a result, Belize remains almost totally dependent on imported petroleum for its energy needs.

Belize has considerable potential for hydroelectric and other renewable energy resources, such as solar and biomass. In the mid-1980s a Belizean businessman proposed the construction of a wood-burning power station for the production of electricity, but the idea foundered in the wake of ecological concerns and economic constraints. In late 2005, a company named Belize Natural Energy found oil in commercial quantities in the Spanish Lookout area of Belize.

Extreme points 

 Northernmost point – Subteniente Lopez
 Southernmost point – Southwestern border with Guatemala, near Chocon
 Westernmost point – Border with Guatemala, at Sarstoon River
 Easternmost point – Lighthouse Reef
 Highest point – Doyle's Delight: 1124 m
 Lowest point – Atlantic Ocean: 0 m

See also
Great Blue Hole

Notes

References

External links 

Maps at Belize.Net
Physical map of Belize